The 1988 Grand Prix de Tennis de Lyon was a men's tennis tournament played on indoor carpet courts at the Palais des Sports de Gerland in Lyon, France, and was part of the 1988 Nabisco Grand Prix. It was the second edition of the tournament and was held from 8 February through 15 February 1988. Unseeded qualifier Yahiya Doumbia won the singles title.

Finals

Singles

 Yahiya Doumbia defeated  Todd Nelson 6–4, 3–6, 6–3
 It was Doumbia's only title of the year and the 1st of his career.

Doubles

 Brad Drewett /  Broderick Dyke defeated  Michael Mortensen /  Blaine Willenborg 3–6, 6–3, 6–4
 It was Drewett's only title of the year and the 9th of his career. It was Dyke's only title of the year and the 6th of his career.

References

External links
 ITF tournament edition details

Grand Prix de Tennis de Lyon
Open Sud de France
Grand Prix de Tennis de Lyon